The Mercedes-Benz M121 engine was a 1.9 liter single overhead camshaft inline four-cylinder engine introduced by Mercedes in 1955 and used in various model lines during the 1950s and 1960s.

Applications included mid-size sedans, such as the 190, the 190SL roadster, and trucks such as the Unimog and L319 models.

History
The M121 engine was developed just after the end of World War II. It was built in the Sindelfingen Works factory, which assembled the Mercedes Ponton Model series to which the engine belonged to. The M121 engine made its debut in 1955. It was the first generation of 4-cylinder engines from Mercedes Benz. The M121 replaced the less efficient M136 1.8-litre engine, a pre World War II engine that was introduced 2 years before in 1953. The M121 benefited from innovations and technology from Mercedes' larger engines such as the M186 3.0-litre and M180 2.2 liter engines. One of these innovations was a new single over head camshaft design which allowed for more power and efficiency. It was developed by a team led by Hans Scherenberg. Within this team, Karl-Heinz Goschel was one of the key engineers who developed the engine design.

The M121 series was in production until 1967, when the M115 series engine took its place.

M121 variants

M121
The M121 engine featured a single chain driven overhead camshaft layout with staggered valves operated by long and short rocker arms. The cylinder block was made from cast iron. The three ring crankshaft was forged. The engine had a compression of 8.5:1. The crankshaft was carried by three main bearings. In the 190 SL, the engine had two parallel carburetors.

The M121 engine was distinctive during its time due to the fact that it stood upright in the engine compartment, and not at an angle like the 300SL's. Looking under the hood, one will notice a series of cast aluminum plenums. A circular air cleaner is mounted on the bulkhead. The aluminum plenums channel air from the air cleaner to the carburetors. Under the carburetors lie a 4 to 1 exhaust manifold.

M121 BI
The newer W110 190 produced in the 1960s featured an updated version of the M121 engine. These performance increases were possible despite the new model's bodywork which was significantly heavier due to new safety implementations to the vehicle.

M121 BII
An updated version of the M121 engine, called the M121 BII, was produced for the Mercedes 190SL. The four-cylinder unit has a single overhead camshaft and is regarded as the progenitor of an entire family of engines. The engine developed  at 5700 rpm. This made the M121 BII one of the faster engines on the road in its day.

M121 BIX
The newest version of the M121 engine was the M121BIX, which was designated as a 2.0-litre engine. The compression ratio was increased to 9.0:1. This engine also used a new Solex 38PDSJ carburetor. The M121 BIX engine was produced from 1965 to 1968 for the Mercedes Benz W110 model series.

Applications
The M121 engine was first employed in the Mercedes Benz "Ponton" models such as the 180. The 190 models featured an updated version of the M121 which offered greater performance through variations in compression ratios and improved carburetor systems. Its use continued in the W110 "Fintail" 190c and 200. The M121 engine has also been used in trucks such as the Mercedes-Benz L319 which was produced in 1967. 1967 1956. Some Unimog off-road models also implemented the M121.

References

M121
Straight-four engines
Gasoline engines by model